Bernard Lloyd (30 January 1934 – 12 December 2018) was a Welsh actor noted for his television roles. He attended the Royal Academy of Dramatic Art and he performed with the Royal Shakespeare Company.

Perhaps his most famous role was as The Traveller, the man who tries to unravel signalman Denholm Elliott's predicament in the 1976 Ghost Story for Christmas, The Signalman, based on the short story by Charles Dickens.

He also played William Holman Hunt in the 1975 Pre-Raphaelite Brotherhood drama The Love School.

Beginning his TV career in Redcap in 1965, he played roles in Hitler's SS: Portrait in Evil, Inspector Morse, Agatha Christie's Poirot and Lewis. He also performed as Jacob Marley's ghost in the 1999 television film adaptation of A Christmas Carol. In 2009 he played the role of the archbishop in the feature film The Young Victoria.

Selected filmography

References

External links

Welsh male television actors
Welsh male stage actors
Welsh male film actors
1934 births
2018 deaths
Alumni of Keele University
Alumni of RADA